The earthquake bomb, or seismic bomb, was a concept that was invented by the British aeronautical engineer Barnes Wallis early in World War II and subsequently developed and used during the war against strategic targets in Europe. A seismic bomb differs somewhat in concept from traditional bombs, which usually explode at or near the surface, and destroy their target directly by explosive force. In contrast, a seismic bomb is dropped from high altitude to attain very high speed as it falls and upon impact, penetrates and explodes deep underground, causing massive caverns or craters known as camouflets, as well as intense shockwaves. In this way, the seismic bomb can affect targets that are too massive to be affected by a conventional bomb, as well as damage or destroy difficult targets such as bridges and viaducts.

Earthquake bombs were used towards the end of World War II on massively reinforced installations, such as submarine pens with concrete walls several meters thick, caverns, tunnels, and bridges.

Theory and mechanism of damage
During development Barnes Wallis theorised that a highly aerodynamic, very heavy bomb with a delayed detonation would cause damage to a target through shock waves travelling through the ground, hence the nickname earthquake bombs.

The airmen who dropped the bombs reported that the target structures stood undamaged by the detonation; "But then the crater collapsed, the ground shifted and the target collapsed". Later computer simulations reached the same conclusions; the significant part of the damage was done by generating a cavity in the ground. That cavity collapsing caused the ground to shift, hence the target's foundation to shift or break causing catastrophic structural damage to the target. The shifting ground caused any larger structure to become severely damaged, even if the bomb missed the target but created a crater near it.

They were not true seismic weapons, but effective cratering weapons.

Development

An explosion in air does not transfer much energy into a solid, as their differing acoustic impedances makes an impedance mismatch that reflects most of the energy. Due to the lack of accuracy of bombing in the face of anti-aircraft defences, air forces used area bombardment, dropping large numbers of bombs so that it would be likely that the target would be hit. Although a direct hit from a light bomb would destroy an unprotected target, it was comparatively easy to armour ground targets with many yards of concrete, and thus render critical installations such as bunkers essentially bombproof. If the bomb could be designed to explode in water, soil, or other less compressible materials, the explosive force would be transmitted more efficiently to the target.

Barnes Wallis' idea was to drop a large, heavy bomb with a hard armoured tip at supersonic speed (as fast as an artillery shell) so that it penetrated the ground like a ten-ton bullet being fired straight down.  It was then set to explode underground, ideally to the side of, or underneath, a hardened target.  The resulting shock wave from the explosion would then produce force equivalent to that of a 3.6 magnitude earthquake, destroying any nearby structures such as dams, railways, viaducts, etc. Any concrete reinforcement of the target would probably serve to enclose the force better.

Wallis also argued that, if the bomb penetrated deep enough, the explosion would not breach the surface of the ground and would thus produce a cavern (a camouflet) which would remove the structure's underground support, thus causing it to collapse. The process was graphically described as a "trapdoor effect" or "hangman's drop".

Wallis foresaw that disrupting German industry would remove its ability to fight, and also understood that precision bombing was virtually impossible in the late 1930s. The technology for precision aiming was developed during World War II, and Barnes Wallis' ideas were then shown to be successful (see for example the Bielefeld raid on 14 March 1945), considering the standards at the time.

Wallis' first concept was for a ten-ton bomb that would explode some  underground. The RAF had no aircraft at the time capable of carrying a ten-ton bomb load aloft, let alone lifting it to such a height. Wallis designed a six-engine aeroplane for the task, called the "Victory Bomber", but there was no support for an aircraft with only a single purpose.

Wallis then took a different line in developing a means to destroy Germany's industrial structure with attacks on its supply of hydroelectric power. After he had developed the bouncing bomb and shown its possibilities, RAF Bomber Command were prepared to listen to his other ideas, even though they often thought them strange. The officer classes of the RAF at that time were often trained not in science or engineering, but in the classics, Roman and Greek history and language. They provided enough support to let him continue his research.

Even from this relatively low altitude, the earthquake bomb had the ability to disrupt German industry while causing minimum civilian casualties. It was used to disable the V2 launch sites at La Coupole and Blockhaus d'Éperlecques, put out of action the V-3 cannon sites at Fortress of Mimoyecques, sink the battleship Tirpitz and damage the U-boats' protective pens at St. Nazaire, as well as to attack many other targets which had been impossible to damage before. One of the most spectacular attacks was shortly after D-Day, when the Tallboy was used to prevent German tank reinforcements from moving by train. Rather than blow up the tracks – which would have been repaired in a day or so – the bombs were targeted on a tunnel near Saumur which carried the line under a mountain. Twenty-five Lancasters dropped the first Tallboys on the mountain, penetrating straight through the rock, and one of them exploded in the tunnel below. As a result, the entire rail line remained unusable until the end of the war. The Bielefeld viaduct was only closed for brief periods by 54 raids dropping 3,500 tons; but in its first use on 14 March 1945 the "Grand Slam" destroyed whole sections of the viaduct.

After World War II, the United States developed the  T12 demolition bomb, which was designed to create an earthquake effect. Given the availability of nuclear weapons with surface detonating laydown delivery, there was little or no development of conventional deep penetrating bombs until the 1991 Gulf War. During the Gulf War, the need for a conventional deep penetrator became clear. In three weeks, a cooperative effort directed by the Armament Systems Division at Eglin Air Force Base in Florida developed the  GBU-28 that was used successfully by F-111Fs against a deep underground complex not far from Baghdad just before the end of the war.

The United States has developed a  Massive Ordnance Penetrator, designed to attack very deeply buried targets without the use of nuclear weapons with the inherent huge levels of radioactive pollution and their attendant risk of retaliation in kind.

Effectiveness
Anglo-American bomb tests (Project Ruby) on the comparative effectiveness of large bombs against reinforced concrete structures were carried out in 1946.

See also
Bunker buster
Compact Kinetic Energy Missile
Grand Slam bomb
Kinetic energy penetrator
T-12 Cloudmaker
Tallboy bomb

References

Anti-fortification weapons
Aerial bombs
World War II weapons
Explosive weapons
Barnes Wallis
English inventions